Tabbasum Arif is a Pakistani actress. She is known for her roles in dramas Chalawa, Ishq Hai, Khalish, Bikhray Moti, Faryaad, Khuda Mera Bhi Hai and Mah-e-Tamaam.

Early life
She was born in 1968 on December 12 in Lahore, Pakistan. She completed her studies from University of Lahore.

Career
She made her debut as an actress in the 1990s on PTV. She was noted for her roles in dramas Ishq Hamari Galiyon Mein, Sarkar Sahab, Mohabbat Humsafar Meri, Humnasheen, Ru Baru, Mohabat Behta Darya and Rukhsaar. Tabbasum also did several advertisements in Dubai and Thailand. Then she appeared in dramas Yeh Mera Deewanapan Hai, Khuda Gawah, Aik Pal, Amrit Aur Maya, Ishq-e-Benaam, Gila, Badnaam and Khuda Mera Bhi Hai. Tabbasum also appeared in telefilm Kyun Pyaar Nahi Milta with Imran Abbas, Rubina Ashraf, Maira Khan and Hassan Niazi. Since then she appeared in dramas Badbakht, Maa Sadqey, Khalish, Tere Bina, Saiyaan Way, Thays, Dil-e-Bereham, Naqab Zan, Chalawa, Bikhray Moti and Ishq Hai.

Personal life
Tabbasum is married and has two children.

Filmography

Television

Telefilm

Film

References

External links
 
 

1968 births
20th-century Pakistani actresses
Pakistani television actresses
Living people
21st-century Pakistani actresses
Pakistani film actresses